Baltimore National Heritage Area is a federally designated National Heritage Area encompassing portions of Baltimore, Maryland, USA. The designated area includes the central portion of the city, waterfront, inner neighborhoods and portions of the city's park system. The district includes Fort McHenry and the Inner Harbor, as well as portions of the Charles Street, Falls Road,  National Historic Seaport and Star Spangled Banner Maryland Scenic Byways. The Baltimore National Heritage Area was established on March 30, 2009 by the Omnibus Public Land Management Act of 2009 (§7002). The designation recognizes the area's unique historic and cultural character, and is intended to stimulate economic development, tourism and historic preservation.

Neighborhoods in the NHA include Little Italy, Fell's Point, Canton, Bolton Hill, Seton Hill, Mount Vernon, Charles Village, Union Square, Locust Point and Federal Hill. City parks within the NHA include Druid Hill Park, Gwynns Falls Leakin Park, Carroll Park and Patterson Park.

References

External links
 Baltimore National Heritage Area
 Baltimore National Heritage Area at the National Park Service

 
History of Baltimore
National Heritage Areas of the United States
Protected areas established in 2009
2009 establishments in Maryland